Nobody's Girl may refer to:
 Nobody's Girl (novel), a 1893 novel by Hector Malot
 "Nobody's Girl" (song), a 1996 song by Michelle Wright
 "Nobody's Girl", a 1989 song by Bonnie Raitt from her album Nick of Time
 "Nobody's Girl", a 2001 song by Ryan Adams from his album Gold
 "Nobody's Girl", a 2003 song by Reckless Kelly from their album Under the Table and Above the Sun
 "Nobody's Girl", a 2005 song by the Bratz Rock Angelz from their album Rock Angelz
 "Nobody's Girl", a 2019 song by Bryan Adams from his album Shine a Light